The Sibyl Agrippina is a circa 1630s oil painting of a Black woman in the guise of the Sibyl Agrippina (also known as Sibyl AEgyptia). The painting is one of a series of Sybils by Jan van den Hoecke, only recently being re-attributed after being known as an early portrait of an African woman by Abraham Janssens. It is held in the Museum Kunstpalast in Düsseldorf.

The motif of a Black woman as "Egyptian" Sybil follows the style of various engravings of sybils in Western religious art. The Sybil is shown here with a whip and a crown of thorns, both attributes of Christ's Flagellation. It was given the Jan van den Hoeke attribution in the 2008 exhibition Black is beautiful: Rubens tot Dumas by prof. Elizabeth McGrath. The inscription reads Siccabitur ut folium (he will be shrivelled like a leaf).

References

Black is beautiful: Rubens tot Dumas, catalog nr. 22, exhibition & catalog in Nieuwe Kerk Amsterdam, 2008
 "Jacob Jordaens and Moses's Ethiopian Wife", by Elizabeth McGrath, Journal of the Warburg and Courtauld Institutes 70, 2007, pp 247-85

External links

http://www.duesseldorf.de/dkult/DE-MUS-038015/142769

1630s paintings
Portraits of women
Black people in art
Paintings in Düsseldorf